Weymouth and Melcombe Regis could refer to:

Municipal Borough of Weymouth and Melcombe Regis
Weymouth and Melcombe Regis (UK Parliament constituency)